Julio del Carmen Tapia Callao (born 27 September 1952) is a Chilean former footballer who played for clubs in Chile and Honduras.

Career
Born in Nogales, Chile, Tapia is a product of Everton de Viña del Mar youth system and made one appearance in the 1971 season for them before joining military service for a year. Then, he returned to play football for Unión La Calera and Regional Antofagasta in his homeland. As a member of Unión La Calera, he scored a goal in the first win in the history of the club against Colo-Colo on 24 January 1974.

In 1976, he moved to Honduras alongside his fellow Andrés Soto Araya thanks to the coach Carlos Padilla and joined Real España, with whom he spent five seasons until 1981, becoming a historical player of the club. In addition to Soto Araya, he also coincided with his compatriot Rubén Rodríguez-Peña when the club became three-times champion in the 1976–77 season. He also scored a goal in the historical hammering by 5–0 against Pumas UNAH on 30 October 1977. He won a second league title in the 1980–81 season.

In Honduras, he also played for Atlético Morazán, Marathón and Atlético Independiente, his last club in 1983.

Personal life
Despite his short stature, he was nicknamed Camión (Truck) due to his strength, an alias that was given him when he was a player of Unión La Calera.

He made his home in El Higuero village from Choloma and owns a balcony factory.

His parents were Emilia Callao and Julio del Tránsito Tapia. Along wis wife, Ana Margarita Pacheco, he has four children.

References

External links
 

1952 births
Living people
People from Quillota Province
Chilean footballers
Chilean expatriate footballers
Chilean Primera División players
Everton de Viña del Mar footballers
Unión La Calera footballers
C.D. Antofagasta footballers
Liga Nacional de Fútbol Profesional de Honduras players
Real C.D. España players
C.D. Marathón players
Chilean expatriate sportspeople in Honduras
Expatriate footballers in Honduras
Association football forwards